Agapius Masong Amo (born April 12, 1960) is a former long-distance runner from Tanzania, who represented his native country in the men's marathon at the 1984 Summer Olympics. There he finished in 21st position, clocking 2:16:25 minutes. He finished fifth at the 1983 World Championships. He won the Stockholm and Belgrade Marathons during his career.

Achievements

External links

1960 births
Living people
Tanzanian male marathon runners
Athletes (track and field) at the 1984 Summer Olympics
Olympic athletes of Tanzania
Place of birth missing (living people)
Universiade medalists in athletics (track and field)
Medalists at the 1983 Summer Universiade
Universiade silver medalists